Kate McMillan is a judge in the Trial Division of the Supreme Court of Victoria. She formerly worked as a solicitor before becoming a barrister where she was appointed a Senior Counsel.

Early life and education
McMillan attended Ruyton Girls' School in Kew, Victoria where she was Vice Captain, Athletics Captain and a Boarding House Prefect. McMillan studied at the Melbourne Law School where she graduated with a Bachelor of Laws in 1974.

Career
McMillan did her articles with John Ball and was admitted as a solicitor in April 1976. Six months later she went to work at law firm Phillips, Fox & Masel. McMillan became a barrister in 1981 where she spent the majority of her legal career, being appointed Senior Counsel in 2000, practising primarily in commercial litigation. She was on the Bar Ethics Committee for 10 years and was the Chair of the Victorian Bar in 2005–6. McMillan represented, the former wife of Bob Jane in various proceedings following their separation.

Supreme Court
McMillan was appointed to the Supreme Court of Victoria on 14 March 2012, where she primarily hears matters in the Common Law Division and is the Judge in Charge of the Trusts, Equity and Probate List.
In 2013 McMillan was accused of doing her nails and reading a legal textbook while witnesses were giving evidence in a lengthy trial. Mc Millan refused an application that she recuse herself due to a reasonable apprehension of bias.

Personal life
McMillan is the co-owner with her husband of an Angus beef farm at Kerrie, near Romsey.

References

Judges of the Supreme Court of Victoria
Australian women judges
Melbourne Law School alumni
Living people
Year of birth missing (living people)
Australian Senior Counsel
People educated at Ruyton Girls' School
Judges from Melbourne